Demetrios Doukas of Crete (c.1480–c.1527) was a professor of Greek in Spain and teacher of many Spanish humanists. Originally a member of the Greek community in Venice (dating from the Fall of Constantinople, 1453), Ducas moved to Spain and took part in the editing of the Complutensian Polyglot Bible. He was succeeded as chair of Greek by Hernán Núñez de Toledo y Guzmán in 1519.

References

1480s births
1520s deaths
16th-century Greek people
Hellenists
Scholars from Crete
Greek expatriates in Spain
15th-century Greek educators
16th-century Greek educators